Tanner Richard (born 6 April 1993) is a Canadian-born Swiss professional ice hockey centre who is currently playing for Genève-Servette HC of the National League (NL). He previously played for the Tampa Bay Lightning of the National Hockey League (NHL).

Playing career
Richard played in the 2006 Quebec International Pee-Wee Hockey Tournament with a youth team from Zürich.

Junior
Richard made his professional debut during the 2010-11 season playing in the National League with the SC Rapperswil-Jona Lakers.
He was selected 71st overall in the 2012 NHL Entry Draft by the Tampa Bay Lightning. He then relocated to North America and played junior hockey with the Guelph Storm of the Ontario Hockey League.

On April 1, 2013, Richard was signed to a three-year entry level contract with the Lightning.

Professional

On December 20, 2016, Richard made his NHL debut, which came in a 4-1 Lightning win over the visiting Detroit Red Wings. On April 25, 2017, Richard left the Syracuse Crunch to join the Switzerland men's national ice hockey team and try to earn a spot for the 2017 IIHF World Championship. It was unknown at the time whether Richard would rejoin the Crunch at a later point if they still remained in the playoffs.

On April 28, 2017, Richard agreed to a two-year contract with Genève-Servette HC of the National League (NL).

On July 20, 2018, Richard was signed to an early two-year contract extension by Geneva, keeping him at the club through the 2020-21 season.

On October 9, 2019, Richard agreed to an early three-year contract extension with Geneva through the 2023/24 season. Following the 2019-20 season, Servette placed Richard on the trading block after he only managed to score 2 goals this season and displayed rather weak performances throughout the year.

International play
Richard participated at the 2012 World Junior Ice Hockey Championships as a member of the Switzerland men's national junior ice hockey team.

On April 25, 2017, Richard was added to Switzerland men's national ice hockey team for the 2017 IIHF World Championship.

Career statistics

Regular season and playoffs

International

References

External links

1993 births
Living people
Swiss expatriate ice hockey people
Genève-Servette HC players
Guelph Storm players
Ice hockey people from Ontario
People from Rapperswil-Jona
SC Rapperswil-Jona Lakers players
Sportspeople from Markham, Ontario
Swiss ice hockey forwards
Swiss people of Canadian descent
Syracuse Crunch players
Tampa Bay Lightning draft picks
Tampa Bay Lightning players